The Biak fantail (Rhipidura kordensis) is a species of bird in the family Rhipiduridae. It is found in Biak.
Its natural habitats are subtropical or tropical moist lowland forests and subtropical or tropical mangrove forests.  It was formerly considered a subspecies of the northern fantail (Rhipidura rufiventris), but was split as a distinct species by the IOC in 2021.

References

Biak fantail
Biak fantail
Taxa named by Adolf Bernhard Meyer